1996–97 Hong Kong FA Cup was the 23rd staging of the Hong Kong FA Cup. It was competed by all of the 7 teams from Hong Kong First Division League and Yee Hope from the Second Division. The competition kicked off on 6 May 1997 and finished on 1 June with the final.

Instant-Double captured the cup for the first time after beating Sing Tao by golden goal in the final.

Fixtures and results

Bracket

References

Hong Kong FA Cup
Hong Kong Fa Cup
Fa Cup